Allan Monteiro (born 1922) was a Pakistani boxer. He competed in the men's bantamweight event at the 1948 Summer Olympics. At the 1948 Summer Olympics, he lost to Babu Lall of India in the Round of 32.

References

External links
 

1922 births
Possibly living people
Pakistani male boxers
Olympic boxers of Pakistan
Boxers at the 1948 Summer Olympics
Place of birth missing
Bantamweight boxers